The Battle of Sarakhs was a battle between the Seljuk Turks and the Ghaznavid state during which Tughril Beg and Chaghri Beg inflicted a major defeat against the Ghaznavids.

When the Ghaznavid sultan Mahmhud returned from India he blamed his general Subashi for events that had occurred during his absence. He ordered Subashi to march against the Seljuks with his army and wage a battle against them.

Subashi marched against the Seljuks. Once the Seljuks had heard of his advance they decided to confront the Ghaznavid army. The two armies met in a day long fight at Sarakhs during which the Tughril Beg and Chaghri Beg inflicted a major defeat against the Ghaznavid general Subashi. The Seljuks captured a large amount of booty and captives. This victory gave the Seljuks complete control over Khorasan.

References

Battles involving the Seljuk Empire
Battles involving the Ghaznavid Empire